Quadrichrome vitiligo is another variant of vitiligo, a cutaneous condition, which reflects the presence of a fourth color (dark brown) at sites of perifollicular repigmentation.

See also 
 ABCD syndrome
 List of cutaneous conditions
 Trichrome vitiligo
 Skin lesion

References 

Disturbances of human pigmentation